Altai electoral district was a constituency created for the 1917 Russian Constituent Assembly election. The electoral district covered the Altai Governorate. List 1, the Old Believers of Altai, was headed by the 28-year old Samuel Fomichev.

Results

In Barnaul city, the Bolsheviks obtained 3,530 votes (44.2%), followed by the SR with 2,228 votes (27.9%), 1,424 votes for the Kadets (17.8%), 396 votes for the Mensheviks (4.9%), 235 votes for the Old Believers (2.9%), 170 votes for the Popular Socialists (2.1%) and 18 votes for the Russian German list (0.2%). In the town garrison, the Bolsheviks obtained 312 votes (49.9%), the SRs 269 votes (43%), Kadets 25 votes (4%), Mensheviks 11 votes (1.9%), Popular Socialists 7 votes (1.1%) and a single vote for the Old Believer list.

References

Electoral districts of the Russian Constituent Assembly election, 1917